Chinedum Iregbu  (born in Zaria, Kaduna State, Nigeria) is a Nigerian Filmmaker and poet. Chinedum is currently the Quality Control Manager for EbonyLife TV, DSTV Channel 165. He is popularly known as Saint Maxzy or Maxzy.

Education 
Chinedum Iregbu is a Young Nigerian Film Director, Editor and part-time Cinematographer. He holds a certificate in Film Production from Gaston Kabore's Imagine Film Training Institute, Ouagadougou, Burkina Faso, a diploma certificate in Mass Communication from University of Jos and bachelor's degree in Film Arts/Motion Picture Production from National Film Institute, Jos Nigeria.

Career 
His films as a Director includes the award-winning political piece, In Dele Giwa's Shoes, Question Mark, Dud's Culture, selected for the 2008 Berlinale Talent Campus and Anfara, a simulation of one of the causes of civil unrest in prone zones of Nigeria, Which got multiple awards including ‘Best Director, Best Videography, Best Edit and Best Score at the Nigerian Television Authority TVC Legacy Awards 2011, and also won The 2012 Emerging Filmmaker Award at the Silicon Valley African Film Festival with Anfara.

His documentary credits includes: "Point of no return" a commentary of Man's cruelty against animals, Great Commission Movement of West Africa's History, Lalle, a documentary on local tattoo, There is Nothing Wrong With My Uncle, a documentary on the Mysticism of Death and Becky's Journey (2014), a Sine Plambech (Denmark) Documentary on illegal immigrants from Nigeria to the Europe etc.

He is one of the young Talents that was commissioned to film the 20 episodes of Documentaries in commemoration of Nigeria's 50th independence anniversary and have worked on many documentary films commissioned by State Governments in Nigeria including Governor Liyel Imoke and Governor Emmanuel Eweta Uduaghan.

See also 
Here's a list of some of the works which he participated in different capacities: Assistant Director, Lillies of the Ghetto, a Gottemburg Funded film, D.O.P, Lemon Green, a Premonition Pictures production, Assistant Director, Blood Stones, a Goethe Institut's Killing Africa, Healing Africa production, D.O.P, Promise, a Johns Hopkins University and USAID Funded project.

Chinedum have also worked for organizations such as Soundcity TV, Aljazeera, AMAA Awards, Copa Coca-Cola, to name but a few, he is currently the Quality Control Manager for EbonyLife TV, Channel 165.

Awards and honours
Winner: 2012 Emerging Filmmaker Award “ANFARA – THEY’VE STARTED” (DIRECTOR, PRODUCER, EDITOR) Silicon Valley African Film Festival, Los Angeles
MULTIPLE AWARDS: Winner: Best Cinematography, Best Edit, Best Score and Best Director “ANFARA – THEY’VE STARTED” (DIRECTOR, PRODUCER, EDITOR) NTA TVC LEGACY AWARDS 2011
Multiple Nominations: “IN DELE GIWA’S SHOES” (Producer/DIRECTOR) IN-SHORT INTERNATIONAL FILM FESTIVAL, 2011
Winner: Best Cinematography “ALL SORTS OF TROUBLE” (D.O.P) IN-SHORT INTERNATIONAL FILM FESTIVAL, 2011
Winner: Best Student Film at the Zuma International Film Festival Abuja, Nigeria with the Film “IN DELE GIWA’S SHOES” 2010 (Producer/DIRECTOR)
Multiple Nominations: Terracotta Awards (2010). Lagos with the Film “LEMON GREEN” (2009). (Director of Photography) BEST CINEMATOGRAPHY.
Official Selection: 58TH Berlin International Film Festival’s (2008). Berlinale Talent Campus, Berlin- Germany with the Film “DUD’S CULTURE” (2007). (Director)
Official Selection: Lonely Hearts Club – NGO's Date Filmmakers BTC Germany 2008 with the script “THE VICISSITUDE” (Writer)

References

1981 births
Living people
Nigerian film directors
Nigerian poets
Nigerian male poets
21st-century Nigerian poets
Nigerian editors
Igbo poets
Nigerian cinematographers
Nigerian media personalities
Nigerian television personalities
Igbo people
University of Jos alumni
Nigerian television directors
Nigerian documentary filmmakers